Neighborhood Public Radio is an independent, artist-run radio project committed to providing an alternative media platform for artists, activists, musicians, and community members. The group was founded in 2005, is based out of Oakland, California. It is currently run by Lee Montgomery, Jon Brumit, and Michael Trigilio, along with an ever-rotating list of ad hoc contributors.

"If it's in the neighborhood and it makes noise .. we hope to put it on the air."

Along with many self-initiated projects, NPR has collaborated on works with many non-profit arts spaces, museums, festivals, and fellow artist collaboratives such as:
 Southern Exposure
 Artists' Television Access
 21 Grand
 of Novi Sad
 Serbia
 Whitney Museum of American Art
 ZeroOne Festival
 Red 76
 Hasan Elahi

External links 
 Neighborhood Public Radio's website

Arts organizations based in California
Public radio in the United States
Community radio in the United States
Mass media in Oakland, California
2005 establishments in California